Sir Edgar Bonham-Carter  (2 April 1870 – 24 April 1956) was a British barrister and administrator in the Sudan and Iraq. In his younger days he was a rugby player of some note and represented England at international level.

Early life and rugby career
Bonham-Carter was born in London, the son of the businessman and lawyer Henry Bonham Carter and his wife Sibella Charlotte (née Norman), and was educated at Clifton College and New College, Oxford, where he took second class honours in jurisprudence in 1892. While at Oxford Bonham-Carter played rugby union for the University team and won two sporting 'Blues' in 1890 and 1891. While still at Oxford he was selected to play for the England national team, in the 1891 Home Nations Championship, against Scotland. This was his only international appearance, but he continued playing rugby after leaving university, joining Blackheath, before turning out for invitational tourists the Barbarians in 1892.

Service in Sudan and Iraq
Bonham-Carter was called to the bar by Lincoln's Inn in 1895 and in 1899 was appointed Legal Secretary of the Sudan.

In Sudan, he had to devise an entirely new legal system, the criminal part of which was largely based on the Indian Penal Code. He held the post, latterly also an Official Member of the Council of the Governor-General of the Sudan, until 1919, when he was appointed Senior Judicial Officer of Mesopotamia (later Iraq), newly under British Mandate after long being a part of the Ottoman Empire. Here he also had to devise a new legal system, adapting the Ottoman system to fit in with modern British ideas of justice, but not imposing too many foreign ideas on the country's longstanding legal system.

While in Iraq, he interested himself in archaeology. At the request of the family of Gertrude Bell he became honorary secretary of the British School of Archaeology in Iraq, which he established on a firm basis. He was chairman of the school until 1950.

Later life
On his retirement in 1921, he returned to England. He contested the London County Council election in 1922 as a Progressive candidate for Bethnal Green North East and was elected. He served for one three-year term. From 1929 to 1939 he was chairman of First Garden City Ltd, which was responsible for the development of Letchworth and from 1940 to 1942 he was chairman of the National Housing and Town Planning Council. He was also a member of the council of the National Trust, which took up much of his time, and was president of the Commons Preservation Society. He was also a member of the council of the  Royal Society for the Prevention of Cruelty to Animals.

Bonham-Carter was appointed Companion of the Order of St Michael and St George (CMG) in 1909, Companion of the Order of the Indian Empire (CIE) in 1919, and Knight Commander of the Order of St Michael and St George (KCMG) in the 1920 New Year Honours for his work in Iraq. He was also awarded the Ottoman Order of Osmanieh, third class, by the Khedive of Egypt in 1902, and the Egyptian Order of the Nile 1st Class in 1916.

Bonham-Carter's brothers included General Sir Charles Bonham Carter and the politician Sir Maurice Bonham Carter, who was the grandfather of the actress Helena Bonham Carter.

See also
Bonham Carter family

Footnotes

References
Biography, Oxford Dictionary of National Biography
Obituary, The Times, 25 April 1956

1870 births
1956 deaths
Lawyers from London
People educated at Clifton College
Alumni of New College, Oxford
English barristers
Members of Lincoln's Inn
British colonial governors and administrators in Africa
Members of London County Council
Knights Commander of the Order of St Michael and St George
Companions of the Order of the Indian Empire
English rugby union players
England international rugby union players
Rugby union forwards
Barbarian F.C. players
Blackheath F.C. players
Oxford University RFC players
Progressive Party (London) politicians
Edgar
Anglo-Egyptian Sudan people
Mandatory Iraq judges
Rugby union players from London